Epithelioid may refer to:

 Epithelioid cell, a cell that resembles epithelial cells
 Epithelioid sarcoma, a soft tissue tumour
 Epithelioid hemangioendothelioma, a vascular tumour occurring in the lining of blood vessels
 Epithelioid blue nevus, a melanocytic nevus
 Epithelioid sarcoma-like hemangioendothelioma, a group of vascular neoplasms
 Epithelioid and spindle-cell nevus, a benign melanocytic lesion affecting the epidermis and dermis
 Epithelioid hemangioma
 Epithelioid cell histiocytoma, a skin condition similar to dermatofibroma

External links